Heliothodes joaquin is a species of moth of the family Noctuidae. It is found in the United States, including Oregon and California.

It was placed as a synonym of Heliothodes diminutiva by Harwick in a 1996. Officially it is still a synonym, but it seems to be a proper species and will probably be re-elevated to species level.

References

External links
Bug Guide

Heliothinae
Moths described in 1946